Cato Alexander (1780–1858) was born enslaved in New York, where he was forced to work in an inn, where he frequently waited on George Washington.  After gaining his freedom in 1799, he continued to work in hotels and inns, before opening his own bar, Cato's Tavern, located on what is now the site of 54th St and 2nd Avenue in Manhattan. Famed Irish actor Tyrone Power considered him "foremost amongst cullers of mint ... for julep" and "second to no man as a compounder of cock-tail."  He was known for his expertise in crafting punches as well.  His bar was so well known that the New York Post published a poem in celebration of his wedding.

Alexander's tavern closed in the 1840s, following a series of bad loans to his customers.  He briefly opened a smaller restaurant, but it lasted only a year.

Some cocktail historians consider him to be "America's first celebrity bartender."

References

American_bartenders
1858 deaths
1780 births